Mahipatgad is a hill fort situated on the east of the Khed. It is one of the largest forts in Maharashtra, with an area of 120 acres. This fort is located 19 km from the Khed City. The Mahipatgad. Suamargad and Rasalgad are situated on a same spur 8 km long, which runs parallel to the western ghats. The Mahipatgad is on the northernmost end of the spur. The altitude of Mahipatgad is 3090 feet.

History
This fort was built by Adilshah of Bijapur in the 15th century. This fort was captured by King Shivaji in 1661. Later it passed to the Peshwas and finally to the British in 1818. There are 10 houses in the Beldarvadi village, which is at the foot hill of the fort. The villagers are said to have been brought by Shivaji as bricklayers for construction of the fort.

Places to see
The Mahipatgad looks like a hill-top covered with dense forest of Jamun, Pisa and similar trees found at higher altitude similar to that of Mahabaleshwar. There are leopards, wild pigs and barking deer on the fort.

The fort is a table land with six battlements and six gateways. The gateways are in a ruined state. The gateways are:
 Laldevdi, on north-eastern side
 Pusati, on eastern side, formerly entered by a ladder
 Yeshwant, on south-eastern side
 Khed, towards southern side; this route is still in use and connects the village Beldarwadi to the fort
 Shivganga, on western side; there is a rock cut shivling near this entrance
 Kotwal, on northern side; the pathway from this gate leads to the village Kotwal in Poladpur taluka

Here the foundation of temples of Maruti and Ganapati are seen with half walls still standing. On the southern side of the fort are remnants of horse stables which are 350-700 in numbers. There are two heaps of unused mortar on the fort. There are two large wells on the fort, one near the Khed entrance and the other near Pareshwar temple. The water from these wells is used for drinking by the villagers. The best time to visit the fort is from October to February.

How to reach
There is a new road being built up to the village Wadibeldar. At present by state transport bus, one can reach the village Wadi-jaitapur. From this village there is a steep trek of two hours to the village Wadibeldar. From Wadibeldar the trek to the fort is about 45 minutes. The Pareshwar temple is ideal for halting at night.

Gallery

References

Forts in Maharashtra
Ratnagiri district
Forts in Ratnagiri district